The 2009 WK League was the inaugural season of the WK League, the South Korean women's football league. It began on 20 April 2009 with the first matches of the regular season and ended on 16 November 2009 with the return leg of the Championship Final. The slogan of the 2009 season was "Beautiful Football".

A total of six teams competed in the 2009 season, playing each other four times during the regular season for a total of twenty matches per team.

Teams

Regular season

League table

Results

First half

Second half

All-Star Game
The six teams were split into two regions: Hyundai Steel Redangels, Seoul Amazones, and Suwon Facilities Management Corporation comprised the Central region, while the Southern region consisted of Busan Sangmu, Chungnam Ilhwa Chunma, and Daekyo Kangaroos. Both regions sent their best players for the All-Star Game.

Kim Joo-hee of the Hyundai Steel Redangels was named player of the match.

Championship

Championship final

Daekyo Kangaroos won 2–0 on aggregate.

References

2009
2009 in South Korean football
South Korea
South Korea